A code is a rule for converting a piece of information into another object or action, not necessarily of the same sort.

Code may also refer to:

Computing

 Code (metadata), data elements whose allowable values can be represented as enumerated lists
 Code point, in numerical value used in character encoding
 Code.org, a non-profit organization and website that encourages U.S. school students to learn computer science
 Coding theory, branch of mathematics and computer science dealing with data transmission
 Computer code, set of instructions forming a computer program which is executed by a computer.
 Machine code, a sequence of instructions to a processor unit
 Source code, a sequence of instructions written in some human-readable computer programming language
 , an HTML element

Science and technology
 Code (coding theory), a subset of cardinality at least two of a Hamming space
 Code (cryptography), device for hiding the meaning of a message
 Code (semiotics), device to carry information in a verbal and/or nonverbal form
 Code (set theory), set with a particular isomorphism to another set
 Barcode, an optical, machine-readable representation of a numeric code that identifies the object to which it is attached
 Baudot code, used in telegraphy
 Diagnosis code, used to translate medical conditions into statistical codes, also used for the purpose of health care planning and reimbursement
 Encoding (memory), storage and recalling of information by organisms
 Genetic code, a correspondence between the structures of messenger RNA and proteins
 Hospital emergency codes, used in hospitals worldwide to alert staff to various emergencies
 Morse code, a method with which humans can transmit letters using only short and long pulses
 Nomenclature codes, rulebooks of scientific naming convention
 Serial code or serial number

Society and law
 Code (law), body of law written and enforced by a sovereign state
 Legal code (municipal), a body of law written by a regional or local governmental entity, such as a U.S. state, a Canadian province, a German Bundesland, or a municipality
 Building code, set of rules that specify the minimum standards for constructed objects 
 Code name, a word or name used to refer to another name, word, project or person
 Ethical code, adopted by a profession, by a governmental or quasi-governmental organ, or by a trade group or other organization
 Code Parish in Latvia

Arts, entertainment, and media

Films
 The Code (2001 film), 2001 Linux documentary
 The Code (2002 film), French film
 Thick as Thieves (2009 film) or The Code, 2009 heist film

Literature
 Code (novel), a 2013 novel by Kathy Reichs
 Code: The Hidden Language of Computer Hardware and Software, a 1999 book by Charles Petzold
 Code and Other Laws of Cyberspace, a 1999 book by Lawrence Lessig
 Code: Version 2.0, a 2006 update to Lessig's 1999 book 
 The Code (novel), a novel in the Nick Carter-Killmaster series

Music
 Code (band), English black metal band
 Codes (band), Irish indie electronic band
 The Code (band), ska punk band
 Code (album), a 1987 album by Cabaret Voltaire
 The Code (album), a 2016 album by Young Noble & Deuce Deuce, or the title song
The Code (EP), an EP by Monsta X
 U;Nee Code or Code, the 2003 debut album by Korean pop singer U;Nee
 "The Code" (song), 2020
 "Code" (song), a 2022 song by Offset and Moneybagg Yo

Television
 The Code (Australian TV series), a 2014–2016 Australian political drama
 The Code (British TV programme), a 2011 British mathematics documentary series from BBC2
 The Code (American TV series), a 2019 American military legal drama
 The Code (game show), British game show
 "The Code" (Smart Guy), a 1997 episode of Smart Guy
 Code: Secret Room, 2016 South Korean TV series
 The Code: Crime and Justice, a 2007 Australian legal documentary program
 The Code (Fear the Walking Dead), an episode of the television series Fear the Walking Dead

Video games
 Code (video game), a puzzle video game
 Konami Code, a cheat code which appears in mainly Konami video games

Other uses in arts, entertainment, and media
 Code (audio standard), or ΧΟΔΕ, high-fidelity audio disc brand developed by T-Bone Burnett
 Code of non-infringement or The Code, of clowns and other performers
 Motion Picture Production Code or Hays Code, the voluntary US films censorship guidelines from 1930 to 1968

Sports and hobbies
 Code, any one of the distinct games known as football
 Code, a unit of scale in model railroading
 Rugby codes, distinguishing between rugby league and rugby union

See also
 CODE (disambiguation)
 Code mixing
 Code-switching (disambiguation)
 Code talker
 Codebook (disambiguation)
 Codec (disambiguation)
 Codex (disambiguation)
 Coding (disambiguation)
 Kode (disambiguation)
 Product code (disambiguation)
 Recode (disambiguation)